DPS Academy (in Arabic: أكاديمية د ب س) (previously known as Union International Indian School) is a private Indian school in Dubai International Academic City, in Dubai, United Arab Emirates which is affiliated to ICSE curriculum, Delhi. It is the third school to run under the aegis of Delhi Public School Society in the United Arab Emirates which also operates Delhi Private School which is affiliated to CBSE curriculum in Dubai and in Sharjah.

In April 2013, the phase one of the DPS Academy started with classes beginning from kindergarten (KG) and grades one to five with an estimate capacity of 2,000 students. In October 2016, the school has announced its closure in March 2017.

Education system
DPS Academy follows the ICSE curriculum. The medium of teaching in the school is English. However, Arabic will be offered as a compulsory language subject for all the students of the school as per the requirements by Ministry of Education and KHDA. Hindi or French will be offered as a second language for the students.

Campus
DPS Academy is  campus. Some of the school facilities for students are:
 Playgrounds and indoor play areas for kindergarten students
 Amphitheatre
 Half Olympic size indoor swimming pool also a separate swimming pool for toddlers,
 Classrooms and language labs
 Medical centres with trained doctors and nurses
 Learning labs with special Educators (SEN Teacher)
 Counselling rooms with a trained counsellor
 Transport facility for students living in Dubai and Sharjah
 ICT and computer laboratories
 Library

DPS Academy introduced the Stem (Science, Technology, Engineering and Mathematics) laboratory as the part of the ICSE curriculum which is also first of its kind in the United Arab Emirates.

External links
 Official Website

References

Schools in Dubai
International schools in Dubai
Delhi Public School Society
Private schools in the United Arab Emirates
Indian international schools in the United Arab Emirates
Educational institutions established in 2013
Educational institutions disestablished in 2017
2013 establishments in the United Arab Emirates